The Bash Brothers are a pair of former baseball players.

Bash Brothers may also refer to:

 Nickname for Fulton Reed and Dean Portman in The Mighty Ducks (film series)
 DJ Concept, co-founder of The Bash Brothers DJ Crew
 The Unauthorized Bash Brothers Experience, a musical comedy special by The Lonely Island

See also